The 2013 Montana Grizzlies football team represented the University of Montana in the 2013 NCAA Division I FCS football season. The Grizzlies were led by second-year head coach Mick Delaney and played their home games on campus at Washington–Grizzly Stadium. Montana participated as a member of the Big Sky Conference, of which they are a charter member. They finished the season 10–3, 6–2 in Big Sky play to finish in third place. They received an at-large bid to the FCS Playoffs where they lost in the second round to Coastal Carolina.

Schedule

Source: Official Schedule

Despite also being a member of the Big Sky Conference, the game with North Dakota on September 14 is considered a non conference game and will have no effect on the Big Sky Standings.

Game summaries

Appalachian State

@ North Dakota

Oklahoma Panhandle State

@ Northern Arizona

Portland State

@ UC Davis

Cal Poly

Eastern Washington

@ Sacramento State

@ South Dakota

Weber State

@ Montana State

FCS Playoffs

Second Round–Coastal Carolina

Rankings

References

Montana
Montana Grizzlies football seasons
Montana
Montana Grizzlies football